Bernard Pomerance (September 23, 1940 – August 26, 2017) was an American playwright and poet whose best known work is the play The Elephant Man.

Biography
Pomerance was born in Brooklyn, New York City in 1940. He studied at the University of Chicago and moved to London in 1968.

His first play, High in Vietnam, Hot Damn, was performed at the Interaction Theatre and directed by Roland Rees. Along with Rees and David Aukin, Pomerance helped to found the theatre company Foco Novo in 1972. The name was taken from Pomerance’s play of the same title, the company’s inaugural production.

For Foco Novo he adapted a new version of A Man’s a Man by Bertold Brecht and wrote The Elephant Man, which was originally produced in 1977. One of the more successful and regularly revived plays to come out of the London fringe theatre, The Elephant Man was performed in repertory at Britain’s National Theatre and several times off and on Broadway. In 1979 The Elephant Man won the Tony Award for Best Play. It ran for 916 performances at The Booth Theatre and was made into a film for television with the original cast. In 2013 Williamstown Theater Festival produced a revival of The Elephant Man, which starred Bradley Cooper, Patricia Clarkson and Alessandro Nivola. The play transferred to the Booth Theater on Broadway in Winter 2014, where it played to sold out houses. It then transferred to the Haymarket Theater, London, in Spring 2015 with the same cast.

The Hollywood film of the same name, directed by David Lynch, was not an adaptation of the play as many people assume. Having used the title and drawn on much of the original content of the play, the production company successfully was sued by Pomerance.

Pomerance first was inspired to write plays by the work of Eugene O’Neill, having seen the original production of Long Day's Journey into Night. A later influence was the British playwright John Arden. Several of Pomerance’s plays take as their subject politically weighted views of American history, such as Quantrill in Lawrence and Melons, which were both produced by the Royal Shakespeare Company.

Personal life
Pomerance was first married to the British writer Sally Belfrage, with whom he had two children. They divorced in 1983. Pomerance married Evelyne Franceschi on August 15, 2008 at the courthouse in Santa Fe, New Mexico. She died in 2015.

Pomerance died at his home in Galisteo, New Mexico on August 26, 2017, following a lengthy battle with cancer. He was 76.

References

 Roland Rees, Fringe First: Pioneers of the New Theatre on Record, Oberon Books, 1996.

External links
 Listing of plays at doollee.com

1940 births
2017 deaths
American male dramatists and playwrights
American male poets
20th-century American dramatists and playwrights
20th-century American poets
University of Chicago alumni
Writers from Brooklyn
20th-century American male writers
American expatriates in the United Kingdom